Springfield Township High School (commonly STHS) is a public high school serving grades 9-12. The school serves Springfield Township, Pennsylvania and is the sole high school of the Springfield Township School District.

History
In 1922, Springfield Township planned to construct a high school to serve both juniors and seniors in the area.  The original high school was completed in 1924, built at Hillcrest Pond, the former site of White City amusement park.  Although expanded several times in the 1930s and 40s, the township needed to construct a bigger high school to meet the demands of the growing township.  The old high school building served as Hillcrest Junior High, and is now home to Phil-Mont Christian Academy.  The current High School, located at 1801 Paper Mill Rd. was built in 1954 with the first class graduating in 1955.  Often during this time, students from surrounding townships that had yet to establish school districts would also attend the high school, with class size swelling to numbers upwards of 300 students in the 1960s.  The current high school has also gone through many additions, including the addition of a natatorium, expanded gymnasium, an extra wing of classrooms, and the Jay Freeze Memorial Lobby.  The high school went under extensive renovation starting in 1999, which also included the renovation of Spartan Stadium, and the construction of a field house.  In 1995, to ease crowding in the elementary schools,  8th grade was moved to the high school.  On October 20, 2009 the School Board approved a restructuring plan that relocated 8th grade to the middle school leaving grades 9-12 in the high school.  This move became effective for the 2010-2011 school year. In 2019 a new auxiliary gym was built in addition to the renovated athletic complex.

Academics 
The school offers fourteen Advanced Placement exams and the opportunity to earn college credit from Penn State University and Montgomery County Community College.

The students take three or four 90 minutes classes in the school's intensive block scheduling program.

The school's library has received several awards, including best high school library website.

Springfield Township High School has also been a pioneer in developing a national computer science curriculum for high school students.  The school took part in the creation of the AP Computer Science Principles program, as well as maintaining a computer science graduation requirement for all students.

In 2009, 93% of the graduating students continued on the higher education, 77% to four-year programs and 16% to two-year programs.  Springfield students averaged a 1628 on the  SAT I (out of a possible 2400), and outscored the national average by more than 20 points in each of the three sections.

Athletics 

Springfield Township High School is a AA member of the PIAA District One.  The school has also been a member of the Suburban One League since 1969, participating in the American Conference.  From 1925 to 1969, Springfield played in the Bux-Mont league.  Springfield briefly left Suburban One in the 2010-2011 school year for the Bicentennial League, but returned to Suburban One for the 2012-2013 school year.

In 1969, the football team won the Bux-Mont League title.  In 1970, The Spartan Football Team was undefeated champions of the Suburban One League.   

In 2022, the wrestling team had a historic season, finishing 4-0 in suburban one league, winning the league championship during senior night against Upper Moreland, winning its first league championship in the programs history.   

Springfield also has five individual state championships.  1992 Men's 100 yard breaststroke, 1999 state cross country, 2000 state tennis singles, and 2011 state 3200 meters, 2021 Women's 100 butterfly And freestyle. In 2021 the men’s and women’s water polo teams won the small school state championship.

Notable alumni 
Ray Benson (formerly Ray Seifert) - Musician, Asleep at the Wheel
Jim Cramer - Investor / Host of CNBC's Mad Money
David Kestenbaum - NPR host, contributor, producer - Planet Money, science correspondent, This American Life
Martin Nisenholtz - Businessman and educator
Lucky Oceans (formerly Rueben Gosfield) - Musician, Asleep at the Wheel
Craig Shoemaker - Actor and comedian
Ben Waxman - Politician, Pennsylvania House of Representatives

Notes

References

External links 
Official Website

Public high schools in Pennsylvania
Schools in Montgomery County, Pennsylvania
1924 establishments in Pennsylvania
Educational institutions established in 1924